Ilkka Villi (born 4 August 1975) is a Finnish actor and writer, best known internationally for his work in the video game Alan Wake as well as the crime drama series Bordertown. He has played a variety of roles in theatre, television, and film.

Early life
Before proceeding with an acting career, Villi worked as a radio journalist and writer.

Career
Villi plays one half of the titular character in the Alan Wake video game franchise. In the role, Villi provides virtual reference for the character model, motion capture, and facial expression capture for Wake, while Matthew Porretta voices the character both in-game and during live-action cutscenes.

In 2016, Villi was cast as one of the lead police investigators in the crime drama series Bordertown, which was picked up by streaming service Netflix.

Selected filmography

Film

Television

Video games

References

External links
 
 Archived version of official website

1975 births
Living people
Male actors from Helsinki
Finnish male film actors
Finnish writers
Finnish male television actors
Finnish male video game actors
21st-century Finnish male actors
Writers from Helsinki